Neurophysin II is a carrier protein with a size of 19,687.3 Da and is made up of a dimer of two virtually identical chains of amino acids. Neurophysin II is a cleavage product (formed by splitting of a compound molecule into a simpler one) of the AVP gene. It is a neurohypophysial hormone that is transported in vesicles with vasopressin, the other cleavage product, along axons, from magnocellular neurons of the hypothalamus to the posterior lobe of the pituitary. Although it is stored in neurosecretory granules with vasopressin and released with vasopressin into the bloodstream, its biological action is unclear. Neurophysin II is also known as a stimulator of prolactin secretion.

Function 
Neurophysin II is a carrier protein for vasopressin (ADH). It is produced in the cell bodies of the paraventricular and supraoptic nuclei and transported to its site of release in the axon terminals of the posterior pituitary. Oxytocin, a hormone similar in structure to vasopressin, is analogously bound and transported by Neurophysin I. Both hormones are nine residues long, and only differ by the amino acids at positions three and eight. Oxytocin possesses Ile-3 whereas vasopressin possesses Phe-3. Both Ile and Phe are hydrophobic amino acids and undergo analogous binding to neurophysins.

Structure 
Neurophysin II is a dimer with each monomer consisting of two anti-parallel β-sheets. Each chain is identical with the exception of a single amino acid substitution (Chain 1 contains Lys-18, whereas chain 2 contains Ala-18). Each chain is 95 amino acids in length and binds a single oxytocin molecule.
The amino acid sequence of Neurophysin II is:

NH2 - Ala - Met - Ser - Asp - Leu - Glu - Leu - Arg - Gln - Cys - Leu - Pro - Cys - Gly - Pro - Gly - Gly - Lys - Gly - Arg - Cys - Phe - Gly - Pro - Ser - Ile - Cys - Cys - Ala - Asp - Glu - Leu - Gly - Cys - Phe - Val - Gly - Thr - Ala - Glu - Ala - Leu - Arg - Cys - Gln - Glu - Glu - Asn - Tyr - Leu - Pro - Ser - Pro - Cys - Gln - Ser - Gly - Gln - Lys - Ala - Cys - Gly - Ser - Gly - Gly - Arg - Cys - Ala - Ala - Phe - Gly - Val - Cys - Cys - Asn - Asp - Glu - Ser - Cys - Val - Thr - Glu - Pro - Glu - Cys - Arg - Glu - Gly - Phe - His - Arg - Arg - Ala - OH

(Disulfide - bridge: - 10-54; - 13-27; - 21-44; - 28-34; - 61-73; - 67-85; - 74-79)

Clinical significance 
Point mutations in the genes that encode arginine vasopressin and or its carrier protein neurophysin II underlie most cases of the familial, autosomal dominant disorder neurohypophyseal diabetes insipidus. (also called hereditary hypothalamic diabetes insipidus). This condition results from insufficient ADH release into systemic circulation.

See also 
 Copeptin
 Neurophysins
 Neurophysin I

References

External links